Malfa is a comune (municipality) on the island of Salina, one of the   Aeolian Islands, in the Metropolitan City of Messina, Sicily, southern Italy.

Malfa derived its name from Amalfi. In the 12th century some families established their lives in Malfa on the island of Salina.

The island of Salina is one of seven Eolian islands. Salina is the greenest of the seven. The main economic activities are agriculture, tourism and fishing. Cultivated products are grapes, capers, olives, figs and pricklypears.

Malfa is famous for producing and exporting the sweet white wine, Malvasia. The fertile soil produces tons of capers for export.

Malfa celebrates the festival of San Lorenzo (Patron Saint of Malfa) on 10 August each year, with a street parade, music and fireworks.

During the 20th century, many Malfitani migrated to Australia and to a lesser number to the United States. The Italian and Australian flags can be seen waving in the wind at the Malfa Municipal Office.

References

Cities and towns in Sicily
Towns and villages in the Aeolian Islands